Ebrahim Alipoor (born September 4, 1989 in Baneh, Iran is an Iranian-Kurdish photographer.

Education
September 2009 to September 2014
Bachelor of Architecture,
Bukan Payame Noor University (PNU), Bukan, Iran

Selected photography certificate
"Digital Photography Certificate", (Excellent Grade of 93/100), Fall 2012, Iran's Technical And Vocational Training Organization, Bukan, Iran
Digital Photography Certificate is Iran's only nationally recognized certificate in the field of photography and one cannot find extensive education in the field of photography in Iran.

Major teaching experiences
Introductory And Complementary Photography Educational Courses, Spring 2014, Baneh Film And Photography Association, Baneh, Iran
"Art" Elementary School Course, Fall and Spring Semesters, Hemn Nonprofit High School, Baneh, Iran
A 3-month Course on "Introductory Photography", Summer 2013, Tehran Institute of Technology, Maragheh, Iran
Workshop on "Architectural Photography", Summer 2013, Architecture Department, Bukan Payame Noor University, Bukan, Iran
A 6-day Course on "Introductory Photography and Landscape Photography", Summer 2012, Bukan Environmental NGO, Bukan, Iran
A 3-month Course on "Photography", Winter 2011, Bukan Payame Noor University Photography And Painting Association, Bukan, Iran

Work experience
 Graphist And Poster Designer of The Film "Mulct", 2014, directed by Mehdi Khalili
 Photographer of the following films:
 "Byroads", 2015, directed by Ashkan Ahmadi 
 "Fall’s Guest", 2014, directed by Nazir Mirzaei
 "Black And White", 2014 directed by Jalal Saedpanah
 "Identity", 2013, directed by Towfigh Amani
 The Documentary "Kurdish ‌Handmade Carpet",  2013, directed by Kaveh Kiyani
 "Shutter", 2012, directed by Farzad Hassanmirzaei
 Assistance with Kurdish magazine such as, Mahabad, Raman, Chrika, Twezhar, Zhmzhiya, Hojan,Dastan, etc.
 Art Expert Of "Kurdistan State Cultural Package", 2012, Iranian Cultural Heritage Organization

Selected exhibitions

Solo exhibitions
"Kurdish Culture Collection" Photo Exhibition, 2014, Ershad Culture and Art Complex, Baneh, Kurdistan, Iran...
"Kurdistan Anthropology" Photo Exhibition, 2013, Slovenia
"Nature Photography" Photo Exhibition, 2013, Culture and Art Complex, Bukan, Iran
"Social Documentary" Photo Exhibition, 2012, Bukan Payame Noor University, Iran

Group exhibitions
"The first photo exhibition of Kurdish photographers, 2015, sanandaj & bukan, Iarn
"Handmade Carpet" Photo Exhibition, 2014, Tabriz Mayor's Museum, Tabriz, Iarn
"Handmade Carpet" Photo Exhibition, 2014, Sari Sooreh Gallery, Sari, Iran
"Nature Photography" Photo Exhibition, 2014, Ershad Culture and Art Complex, Baneh, Kurdistan, Iran
 "Life Days" Social Documentary Photo Exhibition, 2013, Bahman Culture-House Gallery No.1", Tehran, Iran
"Handmade Carpet" Photo Exhibition, 2013, Tehran Carpet  Museum, Tehran, Iarn

Selected awards and honors
Arts Elite, 2014, Iran's National Elites Foundation
International Awards
PSA Gold Medal, 2015, Section Travel, Slovenia Fotostrom Festival, Slovenia
MCPF Award, 2015, 66th International Exhibition of Photography, Midland Salon
CCClub Chairman Choice Award, 2015, Section Nature, Avant-Garde International Fotoart Festival
CCClub Chairman Choice Award, 2015, Section Open Monochrome (PID), Avant-Garde International Fotoart Festival
Salon Gold Medal, 2015, Section Travel, First International Salon, Miracle Image, Pathshala Photography
Avant-Garde Award, 2014, Perspective Two, Indian Visual Arts Foundation, Kolkata, India
FIAP Ribbon, Honorable Mention, 2014, Section Experimental (PID), Perspective Two, Indian Visual Arts Foundation, Kolkata, India
PSA Gold Medal, 2014, Section Open Monochrome (PID), Bengal Autumn, International Circuit of Photography
Salon Gold Medal, 2014, Section Open Monochrome (PID), Bengal Autumn, International Circuit of Photography
Honorable Mention, 2014, 2nd Khayyam International Exhibition of Photography, Iran
6 Photos Accepted, 2014, 9th Holland International Image Circuit, Holland
4 Photos Accepted, 2014, Bristol International Salon of Photography, England
6 Photos Accepted, 2014, International Photography Festival, Montenegro
8 Photos Accepted, 2014, My Favorite Photos Festival, Serbia
2 Photos Accepted, 2014, Varna, Bulgaria
Photo Selected, 2011, ‘Reading changed My life’ Photo Contest, UNICEF

National awards
Jury's Special Honorable Mention, 2015, 1st Health Photo And Film Festival, Nishabur, Iran
Award Winner, 2015, 2nd Humanitarian Film And Photo Festival, Tehran, Iran
Special Selection, 2015, ‘Heaven Frames’ Nationwide Festival, Tehran, Iran
Jury's Special Honorable Mention, 2013, "Handmade Carpet Biannual Photo Festival", Tehran, Iran
Honorable Mention, 2013, "Iranian Regions’ Environment Photo Festival", Western Region, Iran
Honorable Mention, 2013, "The First Ravagh Photo Festival", Tehran,Iran
Honorable Mention, 2013, "Tiba Photo Festival", Tehran, Iran
Honorable Mention, 2013, "The Second Dalahoo’s Tourism Photo Festival", Tehran, Iran
Photo Accepted, 2013, "The Fifth Women and Urban Life Photo Festival", Tehran, Iran
Honorable Mention, 2012, "Iranian Regions’ Photo Festival", Western Region, Iran
Photo of The Year, 2012, Tehran, Iran
2nd Place, 2012, "Iranian Regions’ Photo Festival", Western Region, Iran
3rd Place, 2012, "Sanandaj Traffic Police", Sanandaj, Iran
Photo of The Year, 2012, Tehran, Iran
Photo Accepted, 2011, "The Third Women and Urban Life Photo Festival", Tehran, Iran
Honorable Mention, 2011, "Garden Art Photo Collection", Tabriz, Iran

Memberships and positions of responsibility
Member of The national Iranian Photographer's Society (FIAP), 2015 to present
Member of The International Federation of Photographic Art (FIAP), 2014 to present
Head of Baneh Film and Photography Association, 2014 to present
Member of Young Photographers Club (YPSC), 2013 to present
Head of Bukan Universities’ Photography And Painting Associations, 2009 to 2013
Member of Azerbaijan State's Artists,  2009 to present

Ref

References
 Rechka website
 websait of akkaskhane group
 interview VOA (voice of america) with Ebrahim Alipour 
 Radio kooche  
 کسب رتبه دوم جشنواره پرسپکتیو هند توسط عکاس بانه‌ای
 
 fars news agency 
 درخشش عکاس کُرد در دو جشنواره ملی کشور
 دومین دوره مسابقه عکاسی صنعت تاسیسات
 
 عکاس بجنوردی عناوین برتر جشنواره " قاب سرخ " و " سلامت " را از آن خود کرد
 اخبار عکاسی
 
 
 Gallery – IISKS
 SAHAR Kurdish TV
 Kurdipedia
 500 pix
 international institute for the study of Kurdish societies 
  National Geographic/your shot
 花瓣
 Iran Traveling Center Photography Award

1989 births
Living people
People from Baneh
Iranian photographers
Payame Noor University alumni